Mount Charlton is a  mountain summit located on the west side of Maligne Lake in Jasper National Park, in the Canadian Rockies of Alberta, Canada. Its nearest higher peak is Mount Unwin,  to the west.


History

The peak was named in 1911 by Mary Schäffer for H. R. Charlton, a railroad official who served with the Grand Trunk Pacific Railway as the General Advertising Agent.

The first ascent was made in 1921 by W.R. Hainsworth and M.M. Strumia.

The mountain's name was made official in 1947 by the Geographical Names Board of Canada.

Climate

Based on the Köppen climate classification, Mount Charlton is located in a subarctic climate with cold, snowy winters, and mild summers. Temperatures can drop below  with wind chill factors below . Precipitation runoff from Mount Charlton drains into the Maligne River, which is a tributary of the Athabasca River.

See also
List of mountains of Canada

References

External links
 Parks Canada web site: Jasper National Park

Charlton
Charlton